A village is a type of community in the Canadian Province of Nova Scotia that has a commission established under the Municipal Government Act for the purpose of providing municipal services to a defined area within a larger county or district municipality.

Nova Scotia has 21 villages. According to available population data, Nova Scotia's largest and smallest villages are Bible Hill and River Hebert with populations of 8,913 and 1,296 respectively.

List

Former villages 
Nova Scotia has recognized at least four other villages in its history. The villages of Brooklyn and Milton dissolved on April 1, 1996 upon the amalgamation of the Municipality of the County of Queens with the Town of Liverpool to form the Region of Queens Municipality. On the same date, the villages of Uplands Park and Waverley dissolved upon the amalgamation of the Municipality of the County of Halifax with the cities of Dartmouth and Halifax and the Town of Bedford to form the Halifax Regional Municipality. Havre Boucher was dissolved in 2018.

See also 
Demographics of Nova Scotia
Geography of Nova Scotia
List of communities in Nova Scotia
List of counties of Nova Scotia
List of municipal districts in Nova Scotia
List of municipalities in Nova Scotia
List of towns in Nova Scotia

References 

Villages